Lee Jae-kwon (born 30 July 1987) is a South Korean football midfielder who plays for Changwon City FC.

Club career
Lee, having spent his youth career at Korea University, entered the 2010 K-League draft intake, and was selected by Incheon United FC for the 2010 season.  His professional debut came almost immediately, in Incheon's first K-League match of the season against the Chunnam Dragons. Substituted early in the second half, the match finished in a 1–0 win for his new club. A month later, Lee scored his first goal in Incheon's 1–2 loss to Ulsan Hyundai. Having established himself as a first choice starter at Incheon for the rest of 2010, Lee remained with the club for the 2011 season.

On 1 February 2012, Lee joined fellow league side FC Seoul, in a swap deal which saw Lee Kyu-ro joining Incheon.

Club career statistics

References

External links

1987 births
Living people
South Korean footballers
Association football midfielders
Incheon United FC players
FC Seoul players
Daegu FC players
Ansan Mugunghwa FC players
Busan IPark players
Gangwon FC players
K League 2 players
K League 1 players
Korea University alumni